Glass or Glaß is a surname with several sources.  It can be English, German, Russian/Slavic, Irish or Scottish. Many with the last name Glass, are of eastern European descent, where Glass is a shortened version of their original last name. It is also a Jewish surname, adopted by some Eastern European Ashkenazi in the nineteenth century.  After being forced by the authorities to take on a surname, Jews in this area typically chose names referring to places, animals, occupations or signifying personal traits. The name Glass referred to Glass-making, Glazing and the Glass trade.

Notable people with the surname 
Alice Glass (born 1988), vocalist of Crystal Castles
Aqeel Glass (born 1998), American football player
Ari Glass (born 1989), American painter
H. Bentley Glass (1906–2005), American geneticist
Butch Glass (1898–1972), American Negro league baseball player
Caitlin Glass (born 1981), American voice actress
Carter Glass (1858–1946), American politician
Charles Glass (born 1951), American broadcaster
Cheryl Linn Glass (1961–1997), American race-car driver
Cody Glass (born 1999), Canadian ice hockey player
Conrad Glass (born 1961), Tristanian police inspector and civil servant
Darren Glass (born 1981), Australian rules footballer
David Glass (Canadian politician) (1829–1906), Canadian lawyer
David Glass (sociologist) (1911–1978), English sociologist
David D. Glass (1935–2020), Kansas City Royals owner
Deborah Glass, Deputy Chair of the UK's Independent Police Complaints Commission
Eduard Glass (1902–after 1980), Austrian chess master
Edward Glass (disambiguation), several people with this name
Franklin Potts Glass, Sr. (1858–1934), American publisher
Fridolin Glass (1910–1943), Austrian Nazi activist and SS officer
Gene V. Glass (born 1940), American statistician and education researcher
George Glass (1910–1984), American film producer and publicist
Gerald Glass (born 1967), American former basketball player
Geri Glass (born 1949), American model
Glen Glass (born 1965), American politician
Harold Glass (1918–1989), Australian judge and jurist
Harry Glaß (1930–1997), German ski jumper
Helen Glass (1917–2015), Canadian nurse and educator
Henry Glass (disambiguation), several people with this name
Henry Glaß (born 1953), German ski jumper
Henry Glass (admiral) (1844–1908), Rear Admiral, U.S. Navy
Henry P. Glass (1911–2003), Austrian-born American architect and industrial designer
Hugh Glass (1780–1833), fur trapper and frontiersman
Ira Glass (born 1959), host of This American Life
Jack Glass (1936–2004), Scottish evangelical preacher
Jeff Glass (athlete) (born 1962), Canadian hurdler
Jeff Glass (ice hockey) (born 1985), American Hockey League goaltender
Jesse Glass (born 1954), American writer and poet
Jimmy Glass (born 1973), English former football goalkeeper
Joanna Glass (born 1936), Canadian playwright
John Judah Glass (1895–1973), Canadian politician
Joseph Glass (disambiguation), multiple people
Julia Glass (born 1956), American writer
Kim Glass (born 1984), American volleyball player
Louis Glass (1864–1936), Danish composer
N. Louise Glass, American microbial scientist
Max Glass (1881–1965), Austrian film producer
Ned Glass (1906–1984), Polish-born American character actor
Pat Glass (born 1957), British politician (MP for North West Durham)
Philip Glass (born 1937), minimalist composer
Presley T. Glass (1824–1902), American politician
Richard Atwood Glass (1820–1873), English cable manufacturer and politician
Ron Glass (1945–2016), American actor
Shaun Glass, guitarist for the band SOiL
Solomon Glass (1893–1973), philatelist of Baltimore, Maryland
Stephen Glass (born 1972), journalist
Stephen Glass (footballer) (born 1976), Scottish footballer
Tanner Glass (born 1983), Pittsburgh Penguins center
Todd Glass (born 1964), American stand-up comedian
Walter Glaß (1905–1981), German skier
William Glass (1786–1853), British settler on Tristan da Cunha

Fictional characters
Glass family, a fictional family featured in a number of J. D. Salinger's short stories

References

Surnames from nicknames
Occupational surnames
English-language occupational surnames